Montserrat Vilà i Planella (Figueres, 1964) is a Spanish ecologist who primarily studies the biological and environmental factors that determine the presence and success of invasive plants, as well as their ecological and economic impacts.

Biography
Vilà received a bachelor's degree in Sciences (Biology, 1988) from Autonomous University of Barcelona (UAB).
She did her doctorate at UAB's  (CREAF), under the direction of Dr. Jaume Terradas, and presented the thesis, "Effect of competition in Erica multiflora resprouting, growth and flowering after disturbances", in 1993. Between 1994 and 1996, she worked as a post-doctoral researcher at the University of California, Berkeley. Later, she worked as a research professor associated with CREAF and taught at the University of Barcelona, while maintaining a close link with UC Berkeley.

In 2017 and 2018, she coordinated evaluations and follow-ups in the area of plant, animal, and ecology biology at the State Research Agency. From 2017, she is a member of the scientific committee for flora and fauna of the Ministry of Environment.

Vilà has published more than 170 scientific articles, co-edited seven books, and has written more than 40 book chapters.[4] In 2014 he was one of the 47 people of Spanish nationality chosen Highly cited researcher, the Thomson Reuters agency list of the most cited scientists of the last 10 years. From 2014 to 2019, he has appeared every year in the Highly cited researchers list.

Awards and honours 
 2019, Member of the Scientific Advisory Committee of Fundación Gadea Ciencia.
 2020, Distinction in Ecology Luís Balaguer and honorary member of the Spanish Association of Terrestrial Ecology (AEET).
 2020, North-South Prize from the Council of Europe to the Mediterranean Experts on Climate and Environmental Change (MedECC) network.
 2021, Mercer Award from the Ecological Society of America.
 2021, Numerary member of the Real Academia Sevillana de Ciencias.
 2021,  Alejandro Malaspina in the area of Science and Technology of Natural Resources.

References

1964 births
Living people
People from Figueres
Spanish biologists
Spanish ecologists
Autonomous University of Barcelona alumni
University of California, Berkeley staff
Academic staff of the University of Barcelona